Szeliga is a Polish-language surname. It has archaic feminine forms: Szeligowa for married women and Szeliżanka for unmarried. It is a family name of Polish nobility bearing the Szeliga coat of arms. 

The South Slavic version of the surname is Šeliga and the Ukrainian form is Sheliha. The surname may also appear as Chéliga (French-style), Sheliga, Scheliga, Scheliha, and Šeliha.

Notable people with this surname include:

 Bartosz Szeliga (born 1993), Polish footballer
 Chad Szeliga (born 1976), American musician
 Jan Szeliga (died 1636), Polish-Ukrainian book printer
 Kathy Szeliga (born 1961), American politician
 Maria Szeliga (born 1952), Polish archer
 Marya Chéliga-Loevy or Maria Szeliga (1854–1927), Polish writer
 Michał Szeliga (born 1995), Polish footballer
 Renata von Scheliha (1901–1967), German philologist
 Rudolf von Scheliha (1897–1942), German resistance fighter
 Sławomir Szeliga (born 1982), Polish footballer

See also
 
 Seliga

References

Polish-language surnames